Camp Run is a  long 1st order tributary to the Youghiogheny River in Fayette County, Pennsylvania, United States.

Course
Camp Run rises about 1 mile northeast of Bidwell, Pennsylvania, in Somerset County and then flows south-southwest into Fayette County to join the Youghiogheny River at Bidwell.

Watershed
Camp Run drains  of area, receives about 48.5 in/year of precipitation, has a wetness index of 308.44, and is about 98% forested.

See also
List of rivers of Pennsylvania

References

Tributaries of the Youghiogheny River
Rivers of Pennsylvania
Rivers of Fayette County, Pennsylvania